Jonathan Craven (born March 20, 1965) is an American writer and director. He is the son of the late filmmaker Wes Craven and Bonnie Broecker. He co-wrote the horror sequel The Hills Have Eyes 2 and worked on the short-lived NBC horror series Nightmare Cafe. He manages the group the Chapin Sisters.  He also co-produced the 2009 remake of The Last House on the Left, which is a remake of the 1972 version written, directed and edited by his father, Wes Craven.

Filmography

The Last House on the Left (1972) (actor; boy with balloon; uncredited)
Shocker (1989) (actor; Jogger) (visual effects coordinator) (post-production apprentice editor)
A Gnome Named Gnorm (1990) (art department assistant)
Framed (1990) (TV movie) (property assistant)
Wes Craven's New Nightmare (1994) (assistant to props: additional shooting)
The Hills Have Eyes III (1995) (producer) (writer)
The Minus Man (1999) (property master)
They Shoot Divas, Don't They? (2002) (TV movie) (director)
The Hills Have Eyes 2 (2007) (writer) (co-producer)
The Last House on the Left (2009) (co-producer)
Charm (2012) (producer)
Music videos

 Lifter: "The Rich, Dark, Sultry Red of Hate" (1996)
 Lifter: "Headshot" (1996)

References

External links

IGN interview with Jon Craven
7M interview with Wes and Jon Craven
Variety Article about the two

1965 births
American male film actors
Living people